The Botswana Defence Force Air Arm is the air force of the Botswana Defence Force of Botswana in southern Africa.

Chiefs of the Defence Staff Air Wing 
The former heads of the Botswana Armed Forces Air Wing were referred to while in office as either General Officers Commanding or Chiefs of the Defence Staff.

Overview

The Air Wing was formed in 1960 and is organisationally part of the Botswana Defence Force.

All squadrons are designated with a Z, which is used as a designation for "squadron". The main base is near Molepolole and was built by mostly foreign contractors between 1992 and 1996. The base is a multi-stage project that included runways, taxiways, extensive shelter and ordnance storage facilities, a headquarters facility and a large complex of living quarters and support buildings.  Sometimes referred to as the "Eagle" project, the base has received continual improvements since its inception.  Other airports used are Sir Seretse Khama International Airport at Gaborone and Francistown International Airport in Francistown.

The backbone of the Air Wing consists of a squadron of former Canadian CF-116s which are locally designated as BF-5s. Thirteen ex-Canadian CF-116s (ten single-seater CF-5As and three trainer CF-5Bs) were ordered in 1996 to replace the Strikemasters, with another three single-seaters and two dual-seaters delivered in 2000. The aircraft were re-designated OJ-1 through 16.  For transport, the Air Wing uses Britten-Norman Defenders, CASA C-212 Aviocars, CASA CN-235s and C-130B Hercules. The latest addition to the transport fleet was an ex-AMARC C-130 Hercules to complement the two existing aircraft.

A combination of Bell 412EP and 412SP helicopters are operated by Z21 and perform a variety of functions; search and rescue, medivac, anti-poaching and troop/VIP transport. In 1993, nine ex-US Army/AMARC Cessna O-2As were delivered for use against poaching.

In 2011, Pilatus Aircraft Ltd announced that the Botswana Defence Force had selected the PC-7 MkII turboprop trainer aircraft to replace their Pilatus PC-7 fleet which has been in service since 1990. The contract value is approximately 40 million Swiss francs to procure a fleet of five PC-7 MkII turboprop trainer aircraft, with ground-based training system including computer-based training, spares, support equipment, as well as pilot and technician conversion training elements. The contract was signed in Gaborone on 13 April 2011.

Botswana is also believed to operate Elbit Systems Silver Arrow and Elbit Hermes 450 UAVs.

Accidents and incidents
On 18 April 2002, an F-5 jet crashed at Thebephatshwa Air Base during a routine for the Botswana defence force day. The pilot was killed.
On 20 October 2011, two PC-7s of the Botswana Defence Force were involved in a midair collision over Letlhakeng 100 km west of Gaborone. Two of the four aircrew involved were killed in the accident.
On 27 June 2014, The Botswana Defence Force Air Arm lost an AS350 Ecureuil helicopter which crashed during a routine training at Thebephatshwa Air Base. Two pilots who were on board the aircraft, were taken to hospital in a stable condition.
On 9 February 2017, a BDF CASA C-212 crashed near Thebephatshwa village minutes after leaving the Thebephatshwa Air Base, killing all 3 people on board. The aircraft was on its way to the capital, Gaborone, which is 90 km away.
On 27 April 2018, a day before BDF Day, a BF-5 fighter aircraft crashed at the Gaborone Golf Club during aerobatic rehearsals. The pilot was the only recorded casualty.

Organisation

Z1 Transport Squadron – Maparangwane Air Base (Thebephatshwa/Molepolole)
Z3 Transport (Liaison) Squadron – O-2A, Bat Hawk – Francistown Airport
Z7 Training Squadron – PC-7MkII, King Air 200 – Maparangwane Air Base (Thebephatshwa/Molepolole)
Z10 Transport Squadron – C-130, C-212 and CN-235 – Maparangwane Air Base (Thebephatshwa/Molepolole)
Z12 Transport Squadron – Francistown Airport
Z21 Transport/Helicopter Squadron – Bell 412 – Maparangwane Air Base (Thebephatshwa/Molepolole)
Z23 Transport/Helicopter Squadron – AS-350 – Maparangwane Air Base (Thebephatshwa/Molepolole)
Z28 Fighter Squadron – CF-5 – Maparangwane Air Base (Thebephatshwa/Molepolole)
VIP Flight Squadron – G-IV – Sir Seretse Khama International Airport

Air Bases
Maparangwane Air Base is the only full air base in Botswana. Sir Seretse Khama International Airport is a civilian airport that hosts the VIP jets and Francistown Airport is a joint civilian/military airfield with ownership by the BDF since 2011.

Air defence command and control system
In 2005 Botswana Defence Force (BDF) awarded the Spanish company Indra a €7.1 million contract for the development and implementation of a full air defence command and control system. The project included the development and implementation of an operational control centre, composed of a total of nine air traffic tracking and control posts to process and concentrate the information regarding the country's air space being provided by air surveillance radars, radio communication links with the airships, and air traffic management civil systems.

Aircraft

Current inventory

Retired aircraft
Previous aircraft operated by the Air Force were the Gulfstream IV, Cessna 150, Britten-Norman BN-2 Islander, Scottish Aviation Bulldog, and Short Skyvans.

Notes

Citations

References

Military units and formations established in 1977
National air wings
Air Wing
Aviation in Botswana
1977 in Botswana
Military aviation in Africa